Chancellor is a political title
 Chancellor of Germany 
 Chancellor of Austria
 Federal Chancellor of Switzerland

Chancellor may also refer to 
 Chancellor (surname), a surname

Titles 
 Chancellor (ecclesiastical), a church official
 Chancellor (education), a university official
 Chancellor (Masonic), an officer in some lodges of Freemasons
 Chancellor, a Presiding Judge in a Court of Chancery in the United States
 Supreme Chancellor, a fictional senate position in Star Wars. (see Palpatine)

Places 
 Chancellor, Alabama
 Chancellor, Alberta, a hamlet in Canada
Chancellor, South Dakota
Chancellor, Virginia
Chancellor Peak, a mountain summit in British Columbia, Canada

People 
 Chancellor (musician), an American musician based in South Korea
 Philip the Chancellor, French medieval composer

Others 
Chancellor (chess), a fairy chess piece
Chancellor (grape), a hybrid grape variety
Chancellor Media Corporation, a media company acquired by Clear Channel Communications in 2000
Cessna Model 414 Chancellor
Chancellor’s Pudding, a food
Chancellor Records, a record label
Hotel Grand Chancellor, a hotel chain in Australia

See also
The Chancellor (disambiguation)
Vice-Chancellor (disambiguation)